The Trail of Hate may refer to:

 The Trail of Hate (1917 film), an American short drama film
 The Trail of Hate (1922 film), a lost silent feature western film